This article concerns the period 749 BC – 740 BC.

Events and trends
 748 BC—Anticles of Messenia wins the stadion race at the eighth Olympic Games.
 747 BC—February 26 – Nabonassar becomes king of Babylon.
 747 BC—Meles becomes king of Lydia.
 c. 744 BC—Piye starts to rule in parts of Ancient Egypt.
 745 BC—The crown of Assyria seized by Pul, who takes the name Tiglath-Pileser III.
 745 BC—Legendary death of Titus Tatius Roman King (Diarchy with Romulus ).
 744 BC—Xenocles of Messenia wins the stadion race at the ninth Olympic Games.
 743 BC—Duke Zhuang of the Chinese state of Zheng comes to power.
 743 BC—Beginning of the First Messenian War.
 740 BC—Tiglath-Pileser III conquers the city of Arpad in Syria after two years of siege.
 740 BC—Start of Ahaz's reign of Judah.
 740 BC—Dotades of Messenia wins the stadion race at the tenth Olympic Games.

Significant people
 Romulus and Remus

References